Bussum Zuid is a railway station located in Bussum, Netherlands. It is located approximately 25 km southeast of Amsterdam. It is on the Amsterdam - Hilversum - Amersfoort main line. The station was opened at 22 May 1966. The station is double tracked and has 2 platforms with many trains passing through, with 4 trains stopping per hour.

Train services
The following train services call at Bussum Zuid:
2x per hour local service (sprinter) The Hague - Leiden - Hoofddorp - Schiphol - Duivendrecht - Hilversum - Utrecht
2x per hour local service (sprinter) Hoofddorp - Amsterdam - Hilversum - Amersfoort Vathorst

Bus service
The station is served by one bus service.

External links
NS website 
Dutch Public Transport journey planner 

Railway stations in North Holland
Railway stations opened in 1966
Buildings and structures in Gooise Meren